Mykines may refer to:

 Mykines, Faroe Islands, an island in the Faroe Islands
 Mykines, Mykines, a village on that island
 Mykines, Greece, a village in Argolis, Greece near ancient Mycenae
 The modern Greek name for Mycenae, an ancient archaeological site

See also
 Sámal Joensen-Mikines, painter